Duncan Weir Drummond (12 May 1923 – 17 May 1985) was a Scottish first-class cricketer.

Drummond was born at Greenock in May 1923 and was educated at Merchiston Castle School. A club cricketer for Greenock Cricket Club, he made his debut in first-class cricket for Scotland against Worcestershire at Dundee in 1951. Drummond was a regular feature in the Scotland team of the 1950s, making fifteen first-class appearances from 1951 to 1957. He later made two final first-class appearances in 1961, against the Marylebone Cricket Club at Greenock, and Ireland at Cork. Playing as an all-rounder, he scored 263 runs at an average of 12.52, with a highest score of 33. With his right-arm medium pace bowling, he took 20 wickets at a bowling average of 38.55. His best figures of 4 for 73 came against Worcestershire in 1952. Outside of cricket, Drummound was a company director. He died at Greenock in May 1985.

References

External links
 

1923 births
1985 deaths
Sportspeople from Greenock
People educated at Merchiston Castle School
Scottish cricketers
Scottish businesspeople